Science-Fiction: The Early Years is an American reference book on early science fiction of all countries up until 1930, published by Kent State University Press. The book catalogues over 3000 science fiction works, many of which are very rare and have never been described before. The included works are novels, nouvelles, short stories and occasional plays. Several indexes are included: motif and theme index, date index, magazine index, title index and author index. The book received the Locus Award for Best Non-Fiction in 1992.

The book's foreword acknowledges the difficulty of selecting both the initial and terminal date. The author regards Johannes Kepler's Somnium (1634) as the first story "that could indisputably be called science-fiction". The year 1930 has been chosen as the least objectionable of several possible terminal dates, when genre magazines became widely available in the United States. The book's catalogue is not regarded as complete, as at least two unimportant omissions were noted (Garret Smith's "You've Killed Privacy!" and Donn Byrne's "Through 'HELL' to Peace").

References

Reference works
1990 non-fiction books
Science fiction books
English-language books
American non-fiction books
Kent State University Press books